Joseph J. Allaire (born 1969), better known professionally as J. J. Allaire, is an American-born software engineer and Internet entrepreneur. He created the ColdFusion programming language and web application server and founded Allaire Corporation, OnFolio,   FitNow, and RStudio. Allaire created LoseIt! and Windows Live Writer. Allaire is currently the founder and CEO of statistical computing company RStudio.

Early life
Joseph J Allaire received his bachelor's degree from Macalester College in St. Paul, Minnesota in 1991.

ColdFusion and Allaire Corporation
In 1995, Allaire created ColdFusion. The same year, Allaire founded Allaire Corporation in Minneapolis, Minnesota.

Allaire moved the company to Cambridge, Massachusetts in 1996 with his brother and founding team member, Jeremy Allaire. Allaire served as the Chairman and CEO of Allaire Corporation, then as its Executive Vice President of Products after hiring David Orfao as the company's CEO.

Allaire Corporation had an initial public offering in 1999. In 2001, Allaire Corporation was acquired by Macromedia.

Onfolio, Microsoft, and Windows Live Writer
In 2002, Allaire co-founded Onfolio with Adam Berrey and Charles Teague and led the development of its suite of tools for web research and publishing, released in 2004. Onfolio was acquired by Microsoft in 2006. At Microsoft, Allaire created a blog publishing product called Windows Live Writer, initially released in 2007. Windows Live Writer was distributed by Microsoft as part of Windows Essentials, until it was discontinued in 2015 and forked into an open-source version called Open Live Writer.

FitNow and Lose It!
In 2008, Allaire, Paul DiCristina and Charles Teague co-founded FitNow, a company dedicated to mobile health and fitness applications, and created Lose It!, a mobile weight loss application with over 17 million users.

RStudio
In 2009, Allaire founded RStudio, a company that builds tools for the R statistical computing environment. Allaire created the company's flagship product RStudio, a 2015 InfoWorld Technology of the Year Award recipient.

References

1969 births
Living people
People from South Bend, Indiana
Businesspeople from Minnesota
Macalester College alumni
20th-century American businesspeople
21st-century American businesspeople
American computer businesspeople
American computer programmers
American software engineers
American technology chief executives
American technology company founders
Businesspeople in information technology
21st-century American inventors
R (programming language) people